Noble Nunatak is an isolated nunatak in the north part of the Horlick Mountains, lying 8 nautical miles (15 km) north of Widich Nunatak along the north side of Shimizu Ice Stream. Mapped by United States Geological Survey (USGS) from surveys and U.S. Navy air photos, 1959–60. Named by Advisory Committee on Antarctic Names (US-ACAN) for William C. Noble, meteorologist, Byrd Station winter party, 1958.

Nunataks of Marie Byrd Land